Rosa Navarro is a photographer and mixed-media Colombian artist. Navarro was born on March 23, 1955, in Barranquilla, Colombia.  She was born in Hospital de Barranquilla. She is the daughter of Carlos Navarro Orozco and Rosa María Barandica. Navarro was exposed to the arts since her birth because her mother was an artist who worked with several mediums.

At an early age, Navarro began to learn and draw the human body on the wet sand which was in her home's patio. She also utilized wood, box cartons and clay, where she would get it from her father's ladrilleria (brick gallery).

She was an active artist in the early 1980s. Her first artwork consisted of conceptual art and explored the semiotic meanings and possibilities of her name. Her name "Rosa" means both "rose" and "pink" in Spanish. There are other photographs where she utilizes her body as a vehicle to represent herself. Her artwork can be classified as self-portraits. Navarro has exhibited in group and solo exhibitions in Colombia. She has received awards and won second place at the First Salon Colombo-americano in 1982. Navarro currently lives and has her gallery in Santo Tomas, Atlantico Colombia. She is also currently working on an artwork titled Rosalogico which depicts the human existence as a unique phenomenon inside the beauty that art can only create.

Education 
Rosa Navarro studied at La Normal de Fátima and went on to study at El Instituto Ariano in Barranquilla where she developed her artist portfolio. In 1977 she joined the faculty of the Architecture department and in 1978 she went on to study plastic arts at La Facultad de Bellas Artes, Universidad del Atlántico, Barranquilla.

Artwork

R-O-S-A Lenguaje de los Sordomudos, 1981 
In 1981 a few professors like Antonio Iginio Caro, Alvaro Herazo and Ida Esbra incentivized Rosa to create her first photography artwork titled R-O-S-A, inspired by body parts as language and the color pink.  Letras "R", "O", "S", A", is a reference to her name is sign language. Navarro spells ROSA in sign language with each of the photograph as one letter and colored in pink.  This piece inspired her to create other ones like “Huellas en Rosa” and “Una Rosa es una Rosa”. In addition, she created a piece titled, "La Amorosa", "La Furiosa", "La Misteriosa. All of these photos there are natural thorns and then appear throughout her face. They allowed her to be part of a museum exhibition at the Arte Moderno de Medellín museum, “II Salón Arturo y Rebeca Rabinovich” in 1982.

She became interested in the nature of flowers in the work of Paul Gauguin and began to work with her name Rosa, which is also a flower. In her photography she includes herself not because of her name but because of her identity and as a symbol. In certain occasions she also uses the word Rosa and in some she uses the themes and classic metaphors. For example, she used the classic theme of Dafne, who converts into the Laurel tree after Apollo chases her. She uses that theme but also converts herself throughout her art. She converts into a rose from a rose bush.

Juego de Palabras Amorosa, Misteriosa, Furiosa, Dolorosa 1984 
In 1984 she is invited to showcase her work at the  “IX Salón Atenas” del Museo de Arte Moderno en Bogotá. Afterwards to showcase at the salón “Nominados” de la fundación Gilberto Alzate Avendaño. In 1986 has her first invitation to participate in the XXX Salón Nacional de artistas en Bogotá. Later she participates at the ediciones XXXII, XXXIV, XXXV.  Since that period she has been part of several exhibitions where she showcases her work: “Rosa de los Vientos”, “Juego de Palabras”, “Romana”, “Rosa Patriótica-Rosa Ecológica”, “Recogiendo Espacio” and “Rosa Rosae”. She has gained excellent publicity and art criticisms which have exposed her internationally. Some of her artwork has been exhibited in France several occasions, they include: “Un Revé Rose pour une Rose” en el CDI santa Melanine Chantepie 2001, “Mire salle des Fertes de la Chatoais a Vern” 2002, “Fantasía de una Rosa Caribe” LA MIR La Maison Internacionale de Rennes, 2007.

Nacer y Morir de una Rosa, 1982 
Nacer y Morir de una Rosa (Birth and Death of a Rose) is a black and white series of seven photographs. The artwork depicts the artist's face, and two large black roses covering her eyes. In the first photographs  the roses begin as small buds, eventually growing into large roses and die.

List of artworks 
1981 R-O-S-A Lenguaje de los Sordomudos (in order: R-O-S-A), gelatin silver photograph illuminated with water-based marker, 20.5 x 11 cm each one

1982 Un Rosa es una Rosa, color film photograph, 20 x 25 cm

1982 Nacer y Morir de una Rosa, black and white photograph, 26 x 20.5 cm

1982 Huellas en Rosa, gelatin silver photograph, 19.5 x 25.5 cm

1982 Rosa Rosae, Doble exposure photograph, 48 x 58 cm

1983 R-O-S-A, black and white inverted film photograph, 60 x 50 cm

1984 Juego de Palabras Amorosa, inverted film photograph, 50 x 60 cm

1984 Juego de Palabras Misteriosa, inverted film photograph, 50 x 60 cm

1984 Juego de Palabras Furiosa, inverted film photograph, 50 x 60 cm

1984 Juego de Palabras  Dolorosa, inverted film photograph, 50 x 60 cm

1984 Espinas de Rosa, black and white photograph, 38 x 48 cm

1985 Romana, color film photograph, 12 x 18.8 cm, original work: 1m x 1m, 2m x 1m 

1986 Sin Titulo, inverted film photograph, 50x60cm

1986 Rostros para una ceremonia, canvas and inverted film photograph

1989 Recogiendo Espacio, inverted film photograph, 20 x 25 cm

1989 Rosa de los Vientos, film photograph, 19 x 13.3 cm, original work: 60 x 50 cm

1992 Rosa Patriotica, Rosa Ecologica, photography, painting and mixed media, 160 x 105 cm

Solo exhibitions 
1984 Rosa Navarro, Galería Quintero, Barranquilla.

1986 Retratos para una Ceremonia, Galería Círculo, Santafé de Bogotá.

2007 "Fantasía de una Rosa Caribe", La MIR, La Maison Internacionale de Rennes, France

2012 "El Autoretrato... Una Visión Contemporánea", Biblioteca Luis Eduardo Nieto Arteta, Barranquilla

Collective exhibitions 
1980 Estudio "Colectiva", Galería La Escuela Universidad del Atlantico

1980 Taller III, Galeria La Escuela Universidad del Atlantico

1982 Segundo Salon Rabinovich, Museo de Arte Moderno, Medellin, Colombia

1982 Primer Salón Colombo Americano, Galería Lincoln, Barranquilla.

1983 El Cuerpo Como Lenguaje, Museo de Arte Moderno, Cartagena

1984 IX Salón Atenas, Museo de Arte Moderno de Bogotá.

1987 Intergraf 87, Berlín. 10 Artistas Costeñas, Centro Colombo Americano, Barranquilla.

1984 Rosa Navarro, Galeria Quintero, Barranquilla, Colombia

1986 Retratos para una ceremonia, Galeria Circulo, Bogota

1989 XXXII Salón Nacional de Artistas, Cartagena.

1992 V Salón Regional de Artistas, Comfamiliar Barranquilla.

XXXIV Salón Nacional de Artistas, Corferias, Santafé de Bogotá.

1993 VI Salón Regional de Artistas, Comfamiliar, Barranquilla.

1994 XXXV Salón Nacional de Artistas. Corferias, Santafé de Bogotá.

2001 "Un Revé Rose pour une Rose", CDI Santa Melanie Chantepie Francia.

2001 "Caribe Soy", IUFM de Bretagne Rennes Francia

2002 "Mire Salle des Fertes de la Chatoais a Vern Francia

2003 "Bibliotecarte I" Biblioteca Pública  Julio Hoenisgsberg

2004 "Pequeño Formato", Confamiliar Barranquilla

2005 "Historia de Fotografia en Colombia 1950-200", Museo Nacional BogotáColombia

2006 "Bibliotecarte IV", Biblioteca Pública Julio Hoenisgsberg

2007 "Fotografía Verdad y Stimulación", Museo Nacional de Colombia

2007 "Campo Santo", Lago de Maracay Estado de ARagua Venezuela

2007 "In Memoriam", Gallería La Escuela Universidad de Barranquilla

2007 "Somos Todos", Museo del Atlántico

2008 "Las Carraozas... Obras de Arte", Casa Del Carnaval, Barranquilla

2009 "Arte Sacro", Casa de la Cultura, Sabanalarga Atlántico

2010 "Introitus", Centro de Formación de la Cooperación Española de Cartagena

2013 "Mujeres Costeñas en el Arte", Bohemia Centro de Arte, Barranquilla

2015 "7 Decada de Vanguardia II", Galería de Arte La Escuela, Universidad del Atlántico

2015 Site Decadas de vanguardia II, Universidad del Atlantico, Barranquilla, Colombia

2016 "El Valor de Las Emociones", Combarranquilla

2017 "Radical Women of Latin American Art", Hammer Museum, Los Angeles

2018 "Radical Women of Latin American Art", Brooklyn Museum, New York

2018 "El Arte de la Desobediencia", Museo de ARTE Moderno de Bogotá (MAMBO), Colombia 2018 "Radical Women of Latin American Art", Pinacoteca São Paulo 2018 "Dimensión Desconocida. Otros Relatos del Caribe, Salón Regional del Caribe Colombiano

Awards and honors 
 1982 - Mention, II Salón Rabinovich, Museo de Arte Moderno, Medellín. Second Place, I Salón Colombo Americano, Barranquilla.
 1983 - Second Prize, IV Muestra de Medios de Expresión Plástica, Universidad Autónoma, Barranquilla.
 ARTURO Y REBECA RABINOVI, Museo de Arte Moderno de Medellín 1982
 PRIMER SALON COLOMBO AMERICANO Galería Lincoln Barranquilla 1982

Distinctions 
 Los Recursos de la Imaginación: Artistas Visuales del Caribe Colombiano Primera y segunda Edición Eduardo Márceles Daconte 2010
 Historia de la Fotografía en Colombia 1950 – 2000 Eduardo Serrano
 Museo Nacional de Colombia Editorial Planeta
 Museo de Arte Moderno de Bogotá MAMBO LA COLECCIÓN Junio 2016
 Radical Women: Latin American Art 1960 -1985 HAMMER MUSEUM Ángeles California Septiembre 2017. She was selected to represent Colombia for this exhibition.

Bibliography 
 Alvarado Suescun Toledo. “Una Mirada Crítica Al VIII Salón Regional.” El Heraldo, 10 Aug. 1997, pp. 6–
 "El Salón Atenas." El Heraldo-- Revista Dominical (Barranquilla), 15 Apr. 15 1984
 Gilberto Marenco Better. “El Arte Conceptual Sigue Dando Palo.” Intermedio--Supplemento Del Diario Del Caribe, 31 Oct. 1982, pp. 12–13.
 Jenny Tamayo Montaya. “Barranquilleras Nominadas En Salón de Arte Actual.” Gente Diario Del Caribe, 11 Apr. 1984.
 ———. Los Salones Atenas en la colección del Museo de Arte Moderno de Bogotá. Bogotá: Museo de Arte Moderno, 2003.
 Sandra Patricia, and Bautista Santos. !!Hey chicas¡ ¿Dónde están? Poéticas de acción y reacción del género femenino en el arte Colombiano desde 1980. Enredars Publicaciones.
 Serrano, Eduardo. Historia de la fotografía en Colombia: 1950–2000. Bogotá: Planeta, 2006.
 Valencia, Luis Fernando. "Consideraciones sobre la pedagogía del arte." Revista del arte y la arquitectura en América Latina (Medellín) 2, no. 8 (1982): 31–35.

References

Living people
1955 births
20th-century Colombian women artists
21st-century Colombian women artists
20th-century women photographers
21st-century women photographers
People from Barranquilla
Colombian photographers
Colombian women photographers
Mixed-media artists